The 2022 Tripoli clashes erupted between forces loyal to rival Libyan prime ministers Fathi Bashagha and Abdul Hamid Dbeibeh over the capital city of Tripoli.

Background

The Second Libyan Civil War ended with a ceasefire on 23 October 2020. The Government of National Unity was formed on 10 March 2021, with Abdul Hamid Dbeibeh as prime minister. The House of Representatives, based in eastern Libya, passed a motion of no confidence against the unity government on 21 September 2021, and on 10 February 2022 appointed Fathi Bashagha as prime minister, an appointment rejected by Dbeibeh and the GNU.

Clashes
On 17 May, the arrival in Tripoli of parliamentary-appointed government led by Bashagha has led to several hours of fighting between armed groups. The government team had to withdraw.

On 27 August, clashes between the factions intensified after fighters aligned with Bashagha firing on a convoy in the capital and groups affiliated with Dbeibah stormed a military base belong to a Bashagha-affiliated group. At least 32 people were killed and 159 others were injured.

From 2 to 3 September, clashes again erupted in Warshafala district on the western outskirts of Tripoli as forces aligned with the GNU under Ddeibeh further consolidated their control.

References

August 2022 crimes in Africa
Conflicts in 2022
2022 clashes
Libyan Crisis (2011–present)
May 2022 crimes in Africa
Political violence in Libya
2022 crimes in Libya
2022 clashes